Vasilyevka is a rural locality (a selo) in Yermekeyevsky Selsoviet, Yermekeyevsky District, Bashkortostan, Russia. The population was 7 in 2010. There is one street.

Geography 
Vasilyevka is located 8 km northeast of Yermekeyevo (the district's administrative centre) by road. Semeno-Makarovo is the nearest rural locality.

References 

Rural localities in Yermekeyevsky District